Francis Ernest Lloyd (October 4, 1868 – October 10, 1947) was an American botanist.

Life
Lloyd was born in Manchester, England, and educated at Princeton University (A.B., 1891; A.M., 1895), in New Jersey, and in Europe at Munich and Bonn, in Germany. He was employed at various institutions of higher learning from 1891 onward. He served on the faculties of Williams College, Pacific University, Teachers College (Columbia University), Harvard Summer School, Alabama Polytechnic Institute (professor of botany, 1906–1912), and at McGill University, in Montreal, Quebec, Canada after 1912. 

Lloyd worked as an investigator in the Desert Botanical Laboratory of the Carnegie Institution in 1906 and as cytologist of the Arizona Experiment Station in 1907. He edited The Plant World from 1905 to 1908, and was co-author of The Teaching of Biology in the Secondary Schools (1904; second edition, 1914).

Works
Lloyd wrote:

 The Comparative Embryology of the Rubiaceae (1902)
 with Maurice A. Bigelow, The Teaching of Biology in the Secondary School (1904) 
 
 The Physiology of Stomata (1908)
 Guayule (1911)
 The Carnivorous Plants (1942)

References 

 D'Amato, P. 2010. The Savage Garden: 'Lloydie'. Carnivorous Plant Newsletter 39(2): 47–49.

1868 births
1947 deaths
American botanists
American science writers
Auburn University faculty
Teachers College, Columbia University faculty
English emigrants to the United States
Fellows of the Royal Society of Canada
Harvard University faculty
Academic staff of McGill University
Pacific University faculty
Scientists from Manchester
Princeton University alumni
Williams College faculty